Cos, COS, CoS, coS or Cos. may refer to:

Mathematics, science and technology
 Carbonyl sulfide
 Class of service (CoS or COS), a network header field defined by the IEEE 802.1p task group
 Class of service (COS), a parameter in telephone systems
 Cobalt sulfide
 COS cells, cell lines COS-1 and COS-7
 Cosine, a trigonometric function
 Cosmic Origins Spectrograph, a Hubble Space Telescope instrument

Operating systems
 COS (operating system), a Chinese mobile OS
 Cray Operating System
 Chippewa Operating System, from Control Data Corporation
 Commercial Operating System, from Digital Equipment Corporation
 GEC COS

Places
 Cos, Ariège, France
 Cos or Kos, a Greek island
 COS, IATA code for Colorado Springs Airport, Colorado, US
 Colorado Springs, Colorado, a US city, derived from its airport's code
 Gulf of Cos, Aegean Sea
 Villa de Cos, Zacatecas, Mexico
 Cosio Valtellino (Cös), Lombardy, Italy
 COS, UNDP country code of Costa Rica

Organizations, societies and churches
 Charity Organization Society
 Children's Orchestra Society, New York City, US
 Church of Satan, a religious organization
 Church of Scientology
 Church of Scotland
 Commandement des Opérations Spéciales, coordinating French special forces
 Community of Science, an online database
 Company of Servers, Anglican altar servers
 Cooper Ornithological Society, California, US

Universities and schools
 College of the Sequoias, California, US
 College of the Siskiyous, California, US

Other uses
 Childhood onset schizophrenia
 Roman consul, a political office in Ancient Rome
 COS (clothing), a British fashion brand
 Cos lettuce
 Martín Perfecto de Cos (1800–1854), Mexican general
 Consequence of Sound (now Consequence), a New York, US online magazine
 Cos (television series), 1976, hosted by Bill Cosby
 Space Operations Command (Italy) (Comando delle Operazioni Spaziali)

See also
Kos (disambiguation)